This is a list of New Zealand television related events from 2005.

Events
20 June - Rugby player Norm Hewitt and his partner Carol-Ann Hickmore win the first series of Dancing with the Stars.
17 October - Rosita Vai wins the second series of New Zealand Idol.
American animated sitcom American Dad! begins airing on TV3.

Debuts

Domestic
21 March - Campbell Live (TV3) (2005-2015)
1 May - Dancing with the Stars (TV One) (2005-2009, 2015)
The Unauthorised History of New Zealand (TVNZ) (2005-2009)
Downsize Me! (TV3) (2005-2007)
Ghost Hunt (TV2) (2005-2006)
Kiwifruit (TVNZ) (2005-2006)

International
7 July -  Doctor Who (2005) (Prime)
 Krypto the Superdog (TV2)
 Blue Water High (TV2)
 Justice League Unlimited (TV2)
 Silversun (TV One)
 American Dragon: Jake Long (TV2)
 Fifi and the Flowertots (TV2)
 American Dad! (TV3)
 Bob the Builder: Project Build It! (TV3)
 Transformers: Cybertron (TV2)
 The Batman (TV2)
 Foreign Exchange (TV One)
 Trollz (TV2)
/ The Tofus (TV2)
 Brandy and Mr. Whiskers (TV2)
 Lost (TV2)
 Pokémon Chronicles (TV2)
 The Robinsons (TV One)
 Shoebox Zoo (TV One)
 Noah and Saskia (TV2)
 Scrappy Races (TV4)
 Boohbah (TV3)

Changes to network affiliation
This is a list of programs which made their premiere on a New Zealand television network that had previously premiered on another New Zealand television network. The networks involved in the switch of allegiances are predominantly both free-to-air networks or both subscription television networks. Programs that have their free-to-air/subscription television premiere, after previously premiering on the opposite platform (free-to air to subscription/subscription to free-to air) are not included. In some cases, programs may still air on the original television network. This occurs predominantly with programs shared between subscription television networks.

Domestic

Television shows

1980s
What Now (1981-present)

1990s
60 Minutes (1990-present)
Shortland Street (1992-present)
Breakfast (1997-present)
Target (1999-2013)
Mitre 10 Dream Home (1999-present)

2000s
Street Legal (2000-2005)
Piha Rescue (2001, 2003–2017)
My House My Castle (2001-2009 2011)
Police Ten 7 (2002-present)
Sticky TV (2002-2017)
Eating Media Lunch (2003-2008)
bro'Town (2004-2009)
Saturday Disney (2004-2006)
New Zealand Idol (2004-2006)
Border Patrol (2004-present)
Studio 2 LIVE (2004-2010)
Kiwifruit (2005-2006)
Campbell Live (2005-2015)
Dancing with the Stars (2005-2009, 2015)

Ending this year
17 November - New Zealand's Top 100 History Makers (2005)
December - Frontier of Dreams (2005)

Births

Deaths